The Onagadori ("long-tailed chicken") is a historic Japanese breed of chicken, characterised by an exceptionally long tail. It was bred in the seventeenth century in Kōchi Prefecture, on Shikoku island in southern Japan, and was designated a Japanese National Natural Treasure in 1952. It is one of the ancestors of the German Phoenix breed.

History 

The Onagadori was bred in the seventeenth century in Tosa Province, the area that is now Kōchi Prefecture, on Shikoku island in the south-eastern part of the country. It is reared only in that area, mainly in Nankoku. It is believed to have derived from other long-tailed Japanese breeds including the Shokoku, the Totenko and perhaps the Minohiki. 

The Onagadori was designated a Special Natural Treasure in 1952. Of the seventeen chicken breeds considered Japanese national treasures, it is the only one to have "special" status.

In 2007 the conservation status of the breed, as reported to the FAO, was "endangered". In Japan, approximately 250 of the birds are kept by about a dozen breeders.

Characteristics 

The principal characteristic of the Onagadori is its exceptionally long tail, which exceeds , and has been known to reach . The saddle hackles also grow to a considerable length.

In Japan three colour varieties are recognised: black-breasted white, black-breasted red, and white; genetic study suggests that the black-breasted white was the original type, and that the others were created by cross-breeding with birds of other breeds. In the United Kingdom, five colours are recognised by the Poultry Club of Great Britain: black-red, ginger, gold duckwing, silver duckwing, and white; the same five are recognised by the Entente Européenne.

The comb is single, the eyes are a reddish brown, and the ear-lobes are white.

Use 

The Onagadori is kept for ornamental purposes only. Japanese breeders through the centuries have gone to great pains in the creation and perpetuation of the breed, and provide special hutches with perches well above the ground, where the tails are kept clean and in good condition.

References

Birds of Japan
Chicken breeds originating in Japan